Ayumi Oka (岡あゆみ Oka Ayumi, born September 18, 1983 in Tsu, Mie, Japan) is a Japanese actress.  She has appeared in multiple television shows and films including Hanzawa Naoki, Magerarenai onna and Kinpachi-sensei.

External links

 Profile at Stardust

1983 births
Living people
21st-century Japanese actresses
Actors from Mie Prefecture
Former Stardust Promotion artists
People from Tsu, Mie